The Tuberkuloited is an Estonian punk rock band created in 1991 by Alar Aigro and Indrek "Summer" Raadik in Sindi. In Estonia they had a few hits like "Lilleke rohus" and "Näkineiud" They were known for their melodic approach to punk rock.

Discography
Klassiõhtu (1994) - MC
Lilleke rohus (1994) - MC
Religioon (1995) - CD/MC
Õhtupimedas (1997) - CD/MC
D-duur, Volume 6 (1999) - CD/MC
Kiirteel (2000) - CD/MC
Wiimane (2001) - CD/MC
Estraadialbum (2003) - CD/MC
Põlevad väljad (2004) - CD/DVD
Mis sa teed (2007) - CD

References

External links

Estonian punk rock groups
Musical groups established in 1991
1991 establishments in Estonia